This article shows the qualification phase for 2021–22 CEV Women's Champions League. 10 teams will play in this tournament. The two remaining teams will join the other 18 teams automatically qualified to the League round based on the European Cups' Ranking List. All 8 eliminated teams will then compete in 2021–22 Women's CEV Cup.

First round
 4 teams compete in this round. Winners advance to the Second round and losers compete in CEV Cup

|}

Leg 1 

Leg 2

Second round
 8 teams compete in this round. Winners advance to the Third round and losers compete in CEV Cup

|}

Leg 1 

Leg 2

Third round
4 teams compete in this round.
Winners enter the League round and loser will compete in CEV Cup.

|}

Leg 1 

Leg 2

Final standing

References

Qualification
2021 in women's volleyball